John Balmer (6 February 1916 — 25 December 1984) was an English footballer who played as a striker for English club Liverpool.

Life and playing career
Born in West Derby, Liverpool, Lancashire, England, Balmer played for Collegiate Old Boys and Everton, where he was an amateur, before he was signed by Liverpool manager George Patterson who gave him his first professional contract on 23 August 1935. The 19-year-old made his debut on 21 September 1935 at Elland Road against Leeds in a 1st Division match, however, it wasn't a successful match as Liverpool lost 1–0. His first goal came on 7 December the same year in a league game at Anfield, the 81st-minute strike turned out to be the winner in a 2–1 victory over Preston.

Balmer came from a family of footballers, Uncles Walter and Bob both played for Everton during the early part of the 20th century whilst Uncle Jack was an amateur at Goodison Park.

After the short journey across Stanley Park, Jack flitted in and out of the starting line-up during his first season at the club, fighting for the number 9 shirt with Fred Howe. Balmer would gain great experience playing in an inside forward position as well as his more accustomed centre-forward role.

The Second World War curtailed Balmer's footballing career, as it did so many others, but in doing so it probably took away his best years. Upon resumption of the national league competitions, Balmer formed an impressive partnership with Albert Stubbins, they both finished the first post war season (1946–47)with 24 goals, helping to guide Liverpool to the League title 24 years after their last.

During the title season, Jack created a League record by scoring a hat-trick of hat-tricks (no other player would score even two successive hat-tricks for the club until another number 9, Fernando Torres, did so in 2008). The first came on 9 November 1946 in a 3–0 home win against Portsmouth with the goals coming in the 30th (penalty), 70th and 79th minute, he followed this up a week later with a 4-goal haul away at the Baseball Ground in a 4–1 win over Derby, this included a 6-minute hat-trick, 43rd, 46th and 49th minutes with the 4th coming in the 60th minute. The record breaker came on 23 November at home to Arsenal in the 15th, 61st and 68th minutes of a 4–2 triumph, Stubbins scored the other in the 78th minute bringing to an end a run of 10 consecutive goals by Balmer. He followed this feat up with 5 more goals in his next 4 games, making a grand total of 15 in 7 outings, a strike rate of more than 2 per game. 

Balmer, who was intelligent and very skillful, was given the captaincy in the 1947/48 season and continued prolifically along with Stubbins. He played 313 games, scoring 111 goals between 1935 and 1952 which could have been a lot more if it hadn't been for the Second World War.

It was during the 1939–45 war that he gained his only international recognition playing for England in a wartime match verses Wales at the Recreation Ground in front of a crowd of 17,000 on 18 November 1939, England won 3–2 with John Balmer scoring one of England's goals.

In 1952, after playing 312 appearances for the Reds scoring 111 goals, Balmer retired from the game after averaging a goal every 2.8 appearances for the Reds.

He died on Christmas Day 1984 at the age of 68.

Career details
Liverpool F.C (1935–1952) – 312 appearances, 111 goals – Football League First Division (level 1) championship winners medal (1947)

References

External links
Official player profile at Liverpoolfc.tv
Player profile at LFChistory.net

1916 births
1984 deaths
Footballers from Liverpool
English footballers
Association football forwards
Liverpool F.C. players
English Football League players
England wartime international footballers